This article lists Jewish population estimates by scope, by year, by country and by geographical area.

Population 
All data below, are from the Berman Jewish DataBank at Stanford University in the World Jewish Population (2020) report coordinated by Sergio DellaPergola at the Hebrew University of Jerusalem. The Jewish DataBank figures are primarily based on national censuses combined with trend analysis.
 Core Jewish population refers to those who consider themselves Jews to the exclusion of all else.
 Connected Jewish population includes the core Jewish population and additionally those who say they are partly Jewish or that have Jewish background from at least one Jewish parent. 
 Enlarged Jewish population includes the Jewish connected population and those who say they have Jewish background but not a Jewish parent, and all non-Jews living in households with Jews. 
 Eligible Jewish population includes all those eligible for immigration to Israel under its Law of Return.

Core

Connected

Enlarged

Eligible

See also 
 Jewish population by country
 Historical Jewish population comparisons

References 

Jews by country
Lists of countries
Religious demographics